Magdalena Schnurr (born March 25, 1992 in Baden-Baden) is a German ski jumper. She won the FIS Junior Ski Jumping World Championships 2009 in Štrbské Pleso. She finished in seventh place in the World Championship 2009 in Liberec. She has 4 wins from the Ladies Continental Cup in ski jumping (the highest level).

References

German female ski jumpers
1992 births
Living people
People from Baden-Baden
Sportspeople from Karlsruhe (region)
21st-century German women